"(I Know I Got) Skillz" is the first single released from NBA star and rapper Shaquille O'Neal's debut album, Shaq Diesel.

The song, which saw its official release on September 7, 1993, was produced by Def Jef and Meech Wells and featured a guest verse from Def Jef as well. "(I Know I Got) Skillz" was a success, peaking at 35 on the Billboard Hot 100, becoming Shaq's only solo top-40 hit in the US, although he managed to avoid one hit wonder status as he previously scored a hit as a featured guest on the Fu-Schnickens hit "What's Up Doc? (Can We Rock)". The single was certified gold by the RIAA on December 21, 1993, for shipping of 500,000 copies.

The music video was directed by Scott Kalvert.

The song sampled "It's My Thing" by EPMD and "Large Professor" by Main Source.

"(I Know I Got) Skillz" was also featured on Shaq's compilation, The Best of Shaquille O'Neal and appeared in the film Pineapple Express. Shaq had performed this track at Lollapallooza 2019 in Grant Park, Chicago.

Single track listing

A-side
"(I Know I Got) Skillz" (LP / radio version)- 4:23
"(I Know I Got) Skillz" (remix)- 4:23

B-side
"(I Know I Got) Skillz" (LP / radio instrumental)- 4:08
"(I Know I Got) Skillz" (remix instrumental)- 4:18

Charts

Certifications

References

1993 songs
Shaquille O'Neal songs
Jive Records singles
1993 debut singles
Songs written by Shaquille O'Neal